Kwon Dae-hee,  or  , born 16 August 1989) is a South Korean professional footballer who plays for PT Prachuap in the Thai League 1 as central defender.

He start his football career in Thailand in 2013, after finishing military service in South Korea, with Rayong United in Division 1. He was recognized for his strength and aerial skills. His former manager Pairoj Borwonwatanadilok once called him "the best center-back in Thai Division 1".

Biography

Kwon was born in Seoul, South Korea. He never had an experience in professional football career ever since joining Rayong United in 2013.

Club career

Rayong United

In 2013, after he finished military service in South Korea, Kwon was flown to Thailand for a trial with Rayong United, Second-tier football club. He was impressed by club head coach and agreed a permanent deal on second-leg spell until end of season.

Bangkok F.C.

In following season, after he left Rayong-based club, he re-located to Bangkok and signed for Bangkok F.C. for a 1-year deal. His manager Pairoj Borwonwatanadilok once called him "the best center-back in Thai Division 1 with strong defensive mind, strength and aerial ability".

Prachuap F.C.

In season 2015, the rumor tend to believed that Kwon trial and training during pre-season with highly rated club, Prachuap F.C. On 28 January 2015, Kwon signed for Prachuap F.C. on free transfer to fulfill club defensive line-up and foreign player quota.

In season 2017, Kwon played superbly for PT Prachuap F.C. as the heart of defensive team. He was assigned as "Team Captain" for a few matches during the season.

Honours

Club
 Lamphun Warrior
 Thai League 2: 2021–22

References

1989 births
Living people
South Korean footballers
Kwon Dae-hee
Kwon Dae-hee
Kwon Dae-hee
South Korean expatriate footballers
South Korean expatriate sportspeople in Thailand
Expatriate footballers in Thailand
Association football defenders
Footballers from Seoul